Luis Moreno (born 19 March 1981) is a Panamanian football defender who last played for Tauro.

He gained notoriety after violently kicking an injured barn owl that had landed on the pitch during a league match between Junior de Barranquilla and Deportivo Pereira. The barn owl died due to the kick.

Club career
Born in Panama City, "Lucho" Moreno began playing football with Venezuelan side Deportivo Italia. He was signed by first division club Tauro in 2001. He had a brief spell with Colombian side Envigado during 2005 and 2006, before returning to Tauro. Peruvian side Universitario de Deportes attempted to sign him in 2006, but he stayed with Tauro.

In January 2007, Moreno returned to the Colombian league, joining Independiente Santa Fe. The club terminated his contract in May 2007, after a disciplinary incident. He returned to Tauro, but shortly after joined Mexican Primera División A side Tiburones Rojos.

Moreno was loaned to Deportivo Pereira in January 2011, but returned to Tauro later that year, where he would help the club win its tenth league title in 2013.

International career
Moreno made his debut for Panama in a June 2000 friendly match against Venezuela and has earned a total of 76 caps, scoring no goals. He represented his country in 17 FIFA World Cup qualification matches and has been a key member of the side, participating in the 2005, 2007 and 2009 CONCACAF Gold Cup finals.

His final international was a September 2011 friendly match against Paraguay.

Honours
 CONCACAF Gold Cup All-Tournament Team: 2009

Owl kicking incident
During a February 2011 league match between Junior de Barranquilla and Deportivo Pereira, Junior's unofficial mascot owl landed on the field during play and was struck by a pass. As the owl lay stunned on the field, Moreno, from the opposing team, kicked it approximately 3 meters (~10 feet) to the touchline. Shortly after, he claimed he was prompting it to fly away but in a later interview he admitted "The kick was a product of tension on the field at the time." The owl was treated for its injuries at a local veterinary clinic, but later died of stress related to the incident. Moreno received a two-match ban, a $560 fine from Colombian football's governing body in addition to veterinary costs for the owl's treatment and was ordered to do community service at a zoo.

References

External links
 
 

1981 births
Living people
Sportspeople from Panama City
Association football defenders
Panamanian footballers
Tauro F.C. players
Envigado F.C. players
Independiente Santa Fe footballers
Deportivo Pereira footballers
Categoría Primera A players
Panama international footballers
2001 UNCAF Nations Cup players
2005 UNCAF Nations Cup players
2005 CONCACAF Gold Cup players
2007 CONCACAF Gold Cup players
2009 CONCACAF Gold Cup players
Panamanian expatriate footballers
Expatriate footballers in Venezuela
Expatriate footballers in Colombia
Panamanian expatriate sportspeople in Colombia
Expatriate footballers in Mexico
Association football controversies
Animal welfare and rights in Colombia
Animal cruelty incidents